The Rouse Islands or Rouse Rocks are a small group of islands in the eastern part of Holme Bay in Antarctica, fringing the coast of Mac Robertson Land close south of Welch Island. The Rouse Islands were discovered on February 13, 1931, by the British Australian and New Zealand Antarctic Research Expedition (BANZARE) under Sir Douglas Mawson, who named them for E. J. Rouse of Sydney, who assisted the expedition with photographic equipment. The Rouse Islands have since been found to be islands.

See also 
 Composite Antarctic Gazetteer
 List of Antarctic islands south of 60° S
 SCAR
 Territorial claims in Antarctica

References

Islands of Mac. Robertson Land